Harish Kumar is an Indian athlete and a member of the Indian sepak takraw team. Kumar represented India in the 2018 Asian Games held in Jakarta and Palembang, Indonesia. Kumar was a part of the Indian sepak takraw team that secured the bronze medal at the Jakarta Palembang 2018 Asian Games.

References

Living people
Sepak takraw players at the 2018 Asian Games
Medalists at the 2018 Asian Games
Asian Games bronze medalists for India
Asian Games medalists in sepak takraw
Year of birth missing (living people)
Indian sportspeople
Sepak takraw players